Sporting Cheminot de Pratiques Omnisports or simply SCPO is a French basketball club based in Paris, now disappeared from the top-level.

History 
In 1919 founded the multi-sports Sporting Club de Paris Orleans, a sports club of railwaymen which consists of 4 sections. In 1932 created the basketball section under the patronage of the backbone of Sportive d’Ivry-Port. In 1936 created the National Society of French Railways (SNCF) and the SCPO then changes its name to Sporting Club de Préparation Olympique. The club under the new name became champion of France in 1935-36 and 1937-38 beating Métro during two final games. In 1966 the basketball section disappears to reappear in 1999. In 1972 SCPO again changes its name to the Sporting Cheminot de Pratiques Omnisports.

Honours 

French League
 Winners (2): 1935-36, 1937-38

Notable players 
  Jean Deffin
  André Despagne
  Henri Le Men
  Georges Daeschler
  Jean Pierre Meilhat
  Pierre Roussel
  Georges Gizolmes

Notable coaches 
  Henri Le Men
  Roger Bracon

Basketball teams in Paris
Basketball teams established in 1932
Basketball teams established in 1919